The Great Mosque of Hama, is a mosque in Hama, Syria. Built in the 8th century CE, it was heavily damaged in a 1982 uprising, but today it has been completely restored.

History

The building used to be a temple to worship the Roman god Jupiter, later it became a church during the Byzantine era. When the Muslims entered Syria, they converted it to a mosque under the rule of Abu Ubaidah ibn al-Jarrah.

The Great Mosque has two minarets. One is a square-based tower adjacent to the prayer hall and from an inscription on its surface, dates back to 1124, although some argue that its base is of Umayyad origin, while others say it was constructed in 1153. The second minaret is octagonal in shape and was built by the Mamluks in 1427. At the side of the main northern courtyard is a smaller square courtyard containing the tombs of two 13th century Ayyubid kings.

The mosque was almost completely destroyed during the civil disturbances in Hama in 1982, but has since been rebuilt by the Antiquities Department of the Syrian government. Both minarets were destroyed during the disturbances. By 2001, the Great Mosque has been fully restored and its reconstruction is faithful to the original Umayyad design in nearly every detail.

References

Bibliography
.
.

External links

Great Mosque of Hama. Archnet Digital Library.

8th-century mosques
Mosques in Hama
Religious buildings and structures converted into mosques
Mosques converted from churches